Adyar or Adayar may refer to:

 Adyar, Bhandara, a small town in Maharashtra, India
 Adyar, Chennai, a locality in Chennai (Madras) in the state of Tamil Nadu, India
 Battle of Adyar, October 1746
 Adyar Eco Park (also known as Tholkappia Poonga), an ecological park set up in the Adyar estuary area
 Adyar River, a river in Chennai city
 Adyar Gate, another name of ITC Sheraton Park hotel & Towers in Chennai
 Theosophical Society Adyar, an international occult organisation headquartered in Adyar, Chennai
 Adyar, Karnataka, a town in Karnataka, India
 Adayar (horse), an Irish-bred Thoroughbred racehorse